Garry Roque (born 14 April 1960) is a Canadian equestrian. He competed in two events at the 2004 Summer Olympics. He had previously represented Bermuda.

References

External links
 

1960 births
Living people
Bermudian male equestrians
Canadian male equestrians
Olympic equestrians of Canada
Equestrians at the 2004 Summer Olympics
People from Paget Parish